Esmaili-ye Olya or Esmaili Olya may refer to:
 Esmaili-ye Olya, Ilam
 Esmaili Olya, Kerman